1960 was the 61st season of County Championship cricket in England. The County Championship was won by Yorkshire for the second successive year.

South Africa toured England, playing a five match Test series which England won 3–0. During the series there was a throwing controversy which saw umpire Frank Lee call South African fast bowler Geoff Griffin for throwing in the Lord's Test. This led to umpire Syd Buller repeatedly calling the Griffin for throwing in the following tour match. This had the effect of ending Griffin's Test career and of bringing to a head worldwide discontent about throwing and "dragging" that had caused controversy for the previous two years.

Honours
County Championship - Yorkshire
Minor Counties Championship - Lancashire Second XI
Second XI Championship - Northamptonshire Second XI
Wisden Cricketers of the Year - Neil Adcock, Ted Dexter, Roy McLean, Raman Subba Row, Vic Wilson

Test series

England defeated South Africa 3–0 in a five match Test series.

County Championship

Yorkshire won the County Championship for the second successive year. Lancashire were runners-up.

Leading players
Raman Subba Row topped the batting averages with 1,503 runs scored at an average of 55.66. Brian Statham topped the bowling averages with 135 wickets taken at 12.31 runs per wicket.

References

Annual reviews
 Playfair Cricket Annual 1961
 Wisden Cricketers' Almanack 1961

1960 in English cricket
English cricket seasons in the 20th century